The National Theatre of Mandalay, located in Aungmyethazan Township, Mandalay, is a national theatre of Myanmar. The theatre is used for cultural exchange programs with foreign countries, departmental workshops, religious ceremonies, award ceremonies, performing arts competitions, and musical concerts.

Gallery

References 

1999 establishments in Myanmar
Buildings and structures in Mandalay
Mandalay
Theatre companies in Myanmar
Theatres completed in 1993